The Popigay is a river in Krasnoyarsk Krai, Russia. It s a right tributary of the Khatanga. The river has its source in the Anabar Plateau. It freezes up in October and breaks up in June. Its main tributaries are the Rassokha and Fomich.

See also
List of rivers of Russia

References

Rivers of Krasnoyarsk Krai
North Siberian Lowland